Kalifa Cissé (born 9 January 1984) is a retired footballer who played as a defensive midfielder or centre-back. Born in France, he represented the Mali national team. Cissé is a member of the coaching staff of his former club, Bristol City's.

Club career

Early career
Born in Dreux, France, Cissé started his career as a trainee at French club Toulouse, and moved on to Portuguese Primeira Liga side Estoril. He made only six league appearances and the club was relegated at the end of the season but he caught the attention of Boavista, for whom he signed in 2005.

Reading
His performances in the top division of Portuguese football alerted Reading to his potential and on 16 May 2007, he sealed a move on a three-year contract, for a fee of just under €1 million.

He made his Premier League debut for Reading against Chelsea on 15 August and was sent off in the 72nd minute for a second bookable offence. He scored his first Reading goal on 29 December 2007 in a 6–4 defeat to Tottenham Hotspur.

In his second season at Reading, Cissé became a fan favourite. In the Championship, he scored a crucial goal against eventual champions Wolves as well as a goal that was voted the club's best of the season against Bristol City.

He was used more sparingly in his third season at the club, making only nineteen league and cup appearances. He scored once, in a 2–0 win at Sheffield Wednesday on 5 December 2009.

Bristol City
In July 2010, Cissé joined Bristol City on a two-year deal for an undisclosed fee. The move brought him into contact once again with City manager Steve Coppell, who signed Cissé for Reading.

New England Revolution
Cissé signed with the New England Revolution of Major League Soccer in the United States ahead of the 2013 MLS season. On 6 August 2013, wanting to return to England, Cissé mutually terminated his contract with New England Revolution.

Derby County
Cissé went on trial with Birmingham City in August 2013. After refusing a contract from the club, he went on trial at Championship side Derby County in October 2013. He played the full 90 minutes of a 2–1 under-21s match defeat against Huddersfield Town on 4 November and 5 days later, he signed for the club on a non-contract basis. The same day, he made his league debut for the club against Sheffield Wednesday. He played instead of the suspended John Eustace, having received international clearance the previous evening. The Rams ran out 3–0 winners and head coach Steve McClaren praised his performance. On 18 November, he signed a two-month contract as a reward for his performance. First-team coach Paul Simpson said that the short-term contract was an incentive for Cissé to impress Derby or any other club who might be interested, should his deal not be extended. He missed the club's next match against AFC Bournemouth on 23 November after collapsing shortly after the match against Sheffield Wednesday. He was rushed to hospital and treated for an infected toe.

Bangkok United

Central Coast Mariners
In June 2018, Cissé joined A-League club Central Coast Mariners on a one-year contract. He made his debut on 1 August 2018 in the Round of 32 of the FFA Cup against Adelaide United where they lost 3–0. Cissé retired on 30 January 2019, taking up a coaching position with the Central Coast Mariners Academy.

International career
Although born in France, Cissé played for the Mali U20 team in the 2003 FIFA World Youth Championship, his debut coming v Argentina.

He received his first call up to the Mali senior team on 20 March 2008 for the 2010 World Cup Qualifier v Sudan, which he won 3–0.

Cissé also appeared against Liberia on 9 October 2010, in an Africa Cup of Nations qualifier, as well as in friendlies against Congo (17 November 2010), Ivory Coast (8 February 2011) and Tunisia (10 August 2011).

Personal life
Cissé was born in France to a family with Malian origins, and two of his younger brothers – Salif and Ibrahima – also embraced a professional footballing career.

References

External links
 

1984 births
Living people
Sportspeople from Dreux
Malian footballers
Mali international footballers
Mali under-20 international footballers
French footballers
French sportspeople of Malian descent
Association football central defenders
Association football midfielders
Boavista F.C. players
Bristol City F.C. players
Derby County F.C. players
G.D. Estoril Praia players
Reading F.C. players
Kalifa Cisse
Central Coast Mariners FC players
Expatriate footballers in England
Expatriate footballers in Portugal
Expatriate footballers in Thailand
Expatriate soccer players in the United States
Malian expatriate footballers
French expatriate footballers
Major League Soccer players
New England Revolution players
Citizens of Mali through descent
Premier League players
Primeira Liga players
English Football League players
Kalifa Cisse
A-League Men players
Bristol City F.C. non-playing staff
Footballers from Centre-Val de Loire